Heart valve repair is a cardiac surgery procedure, carried out to repair one or more faulty heart valves. In some valvular heart diseases repair where possible is preferable to valve replacement. A mechanical heart valve is a replacement valve that is not itself subject to repair.

General
Valvuloplasty is the widening of a stenotic valve using a balloon catheter. Types include:
 Aortic valvuloplasty in repair of a stenotic aortic valve
 Mitral valvuloplasty in the correction of an uncomplicated mitral

Valvulotomy

Commissurotomy of heart valves is called a valvulotomy.

By valve

Mitral valve repair

Mitral valve repair is mainly used to treat stenosis (narrowing) or regurgitation (leakage) of the mitral valve.

Aortic valve repair
Aortic valve repair is a surgical procedure used to correct some aortic valve disorders as an alternative to aortic valve replacement. Aortic valve repair is performed less often and is more technically difficult than mitral valve repair.
There are two surgical techniques of aortic-valve repair:
 The Reimplantation-Technique (David-Procedure)
 The Remodeling-Technique (Yacoub-Procedure)

Tricuspid valve repair
Tricuspid valve repair is used to correct tricuspid regurgitation.

History
The first two percutaneous ultrasound-guided fetal balloon valvuloplasties, a type of in utero surgery for severe aortic valve obstruction, were reported in 1991.

See also
 Cardiac surgery
 Bentall procedure
 Open aortic surgery

References

Cardiac surgery
Diagnostic cardiology